The Unloved Woman may refer to:

 The Unloved Woman (play), a 1913 play by Jacinto Benavente
 The Unloved Woman (1914 film), a Spanish silent film directed by Ricardo de Baños 
 The Unloved Woman (1940 film), a Spanish film directed by José López Rubio
 The Unloved Woman (1949 film), a Mexican film directed by Emilio Fernández

See also
 La malquerida (telenovela), a Mexican telenova
 Unloved (disambiguation)